Kerry Raymond Glenn (born January 3, 1962) is a former professional American football player who played cornerback for eight  seasons for the New York Jets and the Miami Dolphins in the National Football League. Pro Bowl alternate in 1991 for special teams.

References

External links
 New York Jets bio

1962 births
Living people
Sportspeople from East St. Louis, Illinois
Players of American football from Illinois
American football cornerbacks
Minnesota Golden Gophers football players
New York Jets players
Miami Dolphins players